Monica Johnson, better known by her stage name Doreen Shaffer (sometimes spelled Schaffer or Schaeffer), is a Jamaican ska, rocksteady, and reggae singer. Known as the "Queen of Ska", she was a founding member in 1964 of the Skatalites.

Career
Johnson was born in Kingston, Jamaica in the early 1940s to a German father and Costa Rican mother.

She started singing at school, initially inspired by jazz singers such as Dinah Washington and Sarah Vaughan. She began her career at Studio One, recording duets with Jackie Opel, before they both joined the Skatalites in 1964.

After the Skatalites disbanded in 1965, Shaffer continued as a solo singer. A collection of her recordings for producer Bunny Lee, First Lady of Reggae, was released in 1970. She had local success in the 1970s with singles "Sugar Sugar" and "Try a Little Smile". In 1979 she released an album with Naomi Phillips, and in 1986 recorded her debut album proper, Wonderful Sounds. She was part of the reformed Skatalites in 1992, and has continued to perform with them until the pandemic. Another solo album, Adorable, followed in 1997. In 2009 she collaborated with the Moon Invaders on the album Groovin'''.

 Discography 
 First Lady of Reggae (1970), Pama
 Read Me Right (1979), Nationwide - Doreen Schaffer & Naomi Philips 
 Wonderful Sounds (1986), Revue/Spiderman - also released as Sugar Sugar Adorable (1997), Grover
 Adorable You (2002), Studio One
 Groovin''' (2009), Grover - Doreen Schaffer with The Moon Invaders

References

External links 
 Doreen Shaffer on discogs

1940s births
Living people
Jamaican reggae singers
Jamaican ska musicians
Rocksteady musicians
The Skatalites members
Musicians from Kingston, Jamaica
Jamaican people of German descent
Jamaican people of Costa Rican descent